Irfan Mensur (born Irfan Kurić, ; 19 January 1952) is a Serbian theatre, television, and film actor of Bosnian descent.

Early life
Born to father Mensur Kurić from Niš whose family traces its origins to Donji Vakuf in Bosnia and Herzegovina and mother Nada Wasche from Sarajevo, Irfan grew up in Sarajevo's Dolac Malta neighbourhood. At the age of 15, as a result of his parents divorcing, young Irfan moved with his father to Niš. 

In Niš, Irfan's father married actress , so Irfan spent part of his teenage years with a stepmother.

Encouraged by his stepmother, young Irfan pursued performing arts and successfully passed the audition to enroll at the Academy of Theatre, Film, Radio and Television in Belgrade. Soon after moving to Belgrade, he legally changed his last name to Mensur in honour of his father.

Cinematic career
After appearing in several supporting roles in different Yugoslav TV series and TV movies, in 1975, twenty-two-year-old Mensur landed the role of Gavrilo Princip in a high-budget Yugoslav-Czech-German co-production The Day That Shook the World directed by Veljko Bulajić. Released in a number of countries, the film about the 1914 assassination of the Austro-Hungarian archduke Franz Ferdinand in Sarajevo was met with lukewarm reviews and had limited box office success. For his part, in later interviews, Mensur talked about being extremely dissatisfied with his own performance in the high-profile movie that "marked me in the Yugoslav public consciousness to the point of forcing me to have to go around convincing different film and TV people [in Yugoslavia] that I'm actually not a bad actor".

Selected filmography

Film

Personal life
In 1976, at the height of his Beach Guard in Winter popularity in Yugoslavia, twenty-four-year-old Mensur married the twenty-three-year-old Trebinje-born model Ljiljana Perović who had, much like him, also spent her childhood in Sarajevo before ending up in Belgrade in pursuit of a show business career. The couple had a son, Filip, in 1983 before divorcing in 1984.

In 1995, Mensur married Srna Lango who, like Mensur, already had a son from a previous marriage. Their son  was born in 1999. In December 2010, Irfan and Srna appeared as contestants in popular reality show Parovi on the Serbian TV station Happy TV. The couple divorced in 2012.

In April 2013, sixty-one-year-old Mensur suffered a heart attack while preparing a play at the Zoran Radmilović Theater in Zaječar. He was immediately rushed to a cardiovascular clinic in Belgrade where a triple bypass surgery was performed.

References

External links

1952 births
Living people
Male actors from Sarajevo
Serbian male actors
Bosniaks of Bosnia and Herzegovina
Bosnia and Herzegovina emigrants to Serbia
Parovi